David Morales (born August 21, 1962) is an American disc jockey (DJ) and record producer. In addition to his production and DJ work, Morales is also a remixer.

David Morales has remixed and produced over 500 releases for artists including Mariah Carey, Aretha Franklin, Michael Jackson, Janet Jackson, Spice Girls, Eric Clapton, Seal, Pet Shop Boys, U2, Donna Summer, Whitney Houston, Selena, and Jamiroquai. Morales was nominated for his first Grammy Award in 1996 as a Producer on Mariah Carey's album “Daydream” for the song “Fantasy”. He was nominated again the next year and won the 1998 Grammy Award for “Remixer of the Year”.

Morales is considered to be one of the first so-called superstar DJs. He has performed at many clubs around the globe, including numerous dates at Ibiza venues such as Pacha and Space. Morales also contributed to radio shows and released DJ mix compilations.

Career

1980s–1990s
David Morales grew up in an influential era for dance music and was a regular at his native New York's fabled clubs such as the Loft and the Paradise Garage,. He also started his own night club in Brooklyn in 1981 at the Ozone Layer, taking cues from both the Paradise Garage and The Loft. His residency at the Ozone Layer (which lasted until 1986) led him to play at the Paradise Garage in 1983.

He DJ'd at Club Zanzibar in Newark, New Jersey in the 1980s as well, home to the Jersey Sound brand of deep house or garage house.

After Morales became a regular DJ during the mid-1980s he began a remixing career, at the same time that remixing other artist became popular. Alongside Chicago house music pioneer Frankie Knuckles and For The Record DJ Pool founder Judy Weinstein, Morales founded Def Mix Productions to manage their work. Today, Def Mix continues to represent the estate of Frankie Knuckles, in addition to Quentin Harris and Hector Romero.

David Morales' solo production debut came in 1993 with the Mercury Records album The Program, credited to David Morales & The Bad Yard Club. In 1998, he released "Needin' U" on the Def Mix label, DMI Records, under the alias The Face. The track licensed to Mercury Records UK became a #1 Dance Record and video which became licensed and covered globally.

2000s–present
Ultra Records released Morales' second album Two Worlds Collide in 2005. The single "How Would You Feel" was performed by Lea Lorien. "Here I Am", performed by UK artist Tamra Keenan (remixed by Kaskade), is featured in the 2006 film, The Devil Wears Prada. "Feels Good", performed by Angela Hunte features in the end credits of 2008 film You Don't Mess with the Zohan.

In 2011 Ultra Records released Morales' third album Changes featuring the vocals of Róisín Murphy (formerly of the band Moloko), Ultra Nate, Tamra Keenan and Jonathan Mendelsohn. Since then Morales has released several tracks including "The Red Zone Project" Volumes 1, 2 and 3 and various others on the Def Mix Music label. In 2016 Morales had a single with Janice Robinson titled "There Must Be Love". He then collaborated with Luciano on the song "Esperanza". In 2019 Morales started a new label with the Afrohouse label MoBlack called MoDef, and also released the single "Freedom" performed by Janice Robinson.

Morales was an owner of Stereo nightclub located in Montreal, Quebec, Canada. As a resident DJ, he played many 16 hour "La Vie en Stereo" sets, which happened monthly for 9 years from 2003 to 2012.

David was a judge on Top DJ in 2016, a national television show broadcast on Italia 1, and was a model for Italian clothing designer Iceberg in 2008.

Personal life
Morales was born in New York City, he is of Puerto Rican ancestry.

In October 2018, Morales was arrested in Japan after he was found with 0.3g of MDMA in his possession at Fukuoka Airport prior to scheduled performances in Fukuoka and Tokyo. He was released  without charge the same month. The maximum penalty for possession of MDMA in Japan is  seven years in prison and a  JP¥3 million  fine.

Discography

Albums 
 1993: The Program
 2004: 2 Worlds Collide
 2012: Changes

Mixed compilations
 1994: United DJs of America, Vol. 4
 1997: Ministry of Sound: Sessions Seven
 2003: Mix The Vibe: Past-Present-Future
 2011: Live & Remastered (disc 2)

Singles

David Morales
2001: "Winners", with Jocelyn Brown
2003: "Make It Hot", with DJ Pierre
2004: "How Would U Feel", with Lea-Lorién
2005: "Feels Good", with Angela Hunte
2005: "Here I Am", with Tamra Keenan
2006: "Better That U Leave", with Lea-Lorien
2006: "How Would U Feel '06", with Lea-Lorien
2011: "You Just Don't Love Me", with Jonathan Mendelsohn
2011: "Holiday", with Polina
2012: "Golden Era", with Róisín Murphy
2012: "Stay", with Polina
2012: "Planet Called Love", with Ultra Nate
2013: "7 Days", with Tamra Keenan
2015: "There Must Be Love", with Janice Robinson
2019: "Freedom", with Janice Robinson

The Bad Yard Club
 All are collaborations with Sly Dunbar and Handel Tucker.
1993: "Gimme Luv (Eenie Meeny Miny Mo)", with Papa San
1993: "Sunshine", with Stanryck
1993: "Forever Luv", with Anastacia
1993: "The Program", with Papa San
1994: "In De Ghetto", with Delta Bennett
1996: "In De Ghetto '96", with Crystal Waters and Delta Bennett

Other aliases
1987: "Do It Properly" (as 2 Puerto Ricans, a Blackman and a Dominican, with Ralphi Rosario and Clivilles & Cole)
1989: "Scandalous", (as 2 Puerto Ricans, a Blackman and a Dominican, with Ralphi Rosario and Clivilles & Cole)
1994: "Congo" (as The Boss)
1995: "Philadelphia", (as Brooklyn Friends)
1998: "Needin' U", (as David Morales presents The Face)
2000: "Higher", (as Moca, with Albert Cabrera and Deanna Della Cioppa)
2001: "Needin' U II", (as David Morales presents The Face, with Juliet Roberts)
2002: "Siren Of Love", (as 928)
2006: "Play", (as Brooklyn Friends)
2006: "Keep It Coming", (as The Face, with Nicki Richards)

Selected remixes 

 2 in a Room - "Wiggle It"
 2 in a Room - "Do What You Want"
 Ace of Base - "Living in Danger"
 The Adventures of Stevie V - "Dirty Cash (Money Talks)"
 Alexander O'Neal - "What Is This Thing Called Love?"
 Alison Limerick - "Where Love Lives"
 Annie Lennox - "Walking on Broken Glass"
 Aretha Franklin - "A Deeper Love"
 Aretha Franklin - "Here We Go Again (Aretha Franklin song)"
 Backstreet Boys - "I Want It That Way"
 Basement Jaxx - "Bingo Bango"
 Betty Boo - "Catch Me"
 Bizarre Inc - "Get Up (Sunshine Street)"
 Björk - "Big Time Sensuality"
 Björk - "Hyperballad"
 Black Sheep - "Strobelite Honey"
 The Brand New Heavies - "Never Stop"
 The Brand New Heavies - "Dream On Dreamer"
 The Brand New Heavies - "Stay This Way"
 Brandon Flowers - "Crossfire"
 Britney Spears - "Circus"
 Burak Kut - "Derdim Var" (Translated: Deep Inside)
 CeCe Peniston - "Finally"
 CeCe Peniston - "I'm In The Mood"
 CeCe Peniston - "Hit By Love"
 CeCe Peniston - "Keep Givin' Me Your Love"
 CeCe Peniston - "Somebody Else's Guy"
 CeCe Rogers - "All Join Hands"
 Celine Dion - "Loved Me Back to Life"
 Cerrone - "Love In C Minor"
 Chaka Khan - "Life is a Dance"
 Cher - "Woman's World"
 Clubhouse - "Deep In My Heart"
 The Chimes - "1-2-3"
 Crystal Waters - "What I Need"
 Daft Punk - "Get Lucky"
 The Daou - "Are You Satisfied?"
 De La Soul - "A Roller Skating Jam Named Saturdays"
 Deborah Cox - "It Could've Been You"
 Deborah Cox - "Who Do U Love"
 Diana Ross - "Upside Down"
 Diana Ross - "The Boss"
 Donna Summer - "Melody of Love (Wanna Be Loved)"
 Doop - "Doop"
 Electribe 101 - "You're Walking"
 Enrique Iglesias - "Rhythm Divine"
 Eric Clapton - "(I) Get Lost
 Eve Gallagher - "Love Come Down"
 FCL - "It's You"
 First Choice - "Love Thang"
 Frankie Knuckles - "Rain Falls"
 Gabrielle - "Give Me a Little More Time"
 Gloria Estefan - "Oye Mi Canto"
 Gloria Estefan - "Reach"
 Gloria Estefan - "Turn The Beat Around"
 Heavy D & The Boyz - "Now That We Found Love"
 Incognito - "Always There"
 India - "Right From The Start"
 Inner City - "Watcha Gonna Do With My Lovin'"
 INXS - "I'm Only Looking"
 Jamiroquai - "Cosmic Girl"
 Jamiroquai - "Space Cowboy"
 Jane Child - "Do Whatcha Do"
 Janet Jackson - "Because of Love"
 Janet Jackson - "Throb"
 Janet Jackson - "When I Think of You" (1995 Remixes)
 Janet Jackson - " Got 'til It's Gone with Frankie Knuckles
 Jaydee - "Plastic Dreams" (1997 Remixes)
 Jennifer Paige - "Crush"
 Jody Watley - "I'm The One You Need"
 Juliet Roberts - "Free Love"
 Kelis - "Get Along With You"
 Kristine W - "One More Try"
 Kylie Minogue - "Where Is The Feeling?"
 Kym Mazelle - "Useless"
 Kym Sims - "We Got A Love"
 Knight Time - "I've Been Watching You"
 Kuva - "Isn't It Time"
 Lara Fabian - "I Will Love Again"
 Lisa Stansfield - "What Did I Do to You?"
 Lisa Stansfield - "Someday (I'm Coming Back)"
 Lisa Stansfield - "Little Bit of Heaven"
 Lisa Stansfield - "8-3-1"
 Lisa Fischer - "Save Me"
 Loose Ends - "Love's Got Me"
 Lucas Frota Featuring Blakkat - "Change (Will Come)"
 Lucrezia - "Live To Tell"
 Luther Vandross - "Ain't No Stoppin' Us Now"
 Luther Vandross - "The Mistletoe Jam (Everybody Kiss Somebody)"
 Luther Vandross - "The Rush"
 Luther Vandross & Janet Jackson - "The Best Things in Life Are Free"
 M People - "One Night in Heaven"
 M People - "Fantasy Island"
 M People - "Dreaming"
 Madonna - "Deeper and Deeper"
 Mariah Carey - "Always Be My Baby"
 Mariah Carey - "Can't Take That Away (Mariah's Theme)"
 Mariah Carey - "Dreamlover"
 Mariah Carey - "Fantasy"
 Mariah Carey - "Fly Away (Butterfly Reprise)"
 Mariah Carey - "Honey"
 Mariah Carey - "I Still Believe"
 Mariah Carey - "It's Like That"
 Mariah Carey - "Joy To The World"
 Mariah Carey - "Loverboy"
 Mariah Carey - "My All"
 Mariah Carey - "Say Somethin"
 Mariah Carey - "Shake It Off"
 Mariah Carey - "The Roof (Back In Time)"
 Mariah Carey - "Touch My Body"
 Masters At Work - "I Can't Get No Sleep '95"
 Michael Jackson featuring Justin Timberlake - "Love Never Felt So Good" (remixed by David Morales, Eric Kupper & Frankie Knuckles)
 Michael Jackson featuring Janet Jackson - "Scream"
 Michael Jackson - "This Time Around"
 Michael Jackson - "Thriller"
 Neneh Cherry - "Kisses on the Wind"
 Nightcrawlers - "Should I Ever Fall in Love"
 P. M. Dawn - "Gotta Be...Movin' On Up"
 Pet Shop Boys - "How can you expect to be taken seriously?"
 Pet Shop Boys - "I Don't Know What You Want But I Can't Give It Any More"
 Pet Shop Boys - "New York City Boy"
 Pet Shop Boys - "So Hard"
 Pet Shop Boys - "Where the Streets Have No Name (I Can't Take My Eyes off You)"
 Photek - "Mine To Give"
 Reese - "You're Mine"
 Richard Darbyshire - "This I Swear" with Frankie Knuckles
 Robert Owens - "I'll Be Your Friend"
 Robin S. - "I Want to Thank You"
 Sandy B. - "Feel Like Singin'"
 Seal - "Newborn Friend"
 Selena - "I'm Getting Used to You"
 Shabba Ranks - "Mr. Loverman"
 Shara Nelson - "Down That Road
 Sheena Easton - "101"
 Smoke City - "Underwater Love"
 Soul Shaker featuring CeCe Peniston - Shame, Shame, Shame
 Sounds of Blackness - "I Believe"
 Spice Girls - "Spice Up Your Life"
 Spice Girls - "Stop"
 Spice Girls - "Who Do You Think You Are"
 Suzanne Palmer - "Luv 2 Luv"
 Taylor Dayne - "Say a Prayer"
 Technotronic - "Get Up!"
 Technotronic - "Pump Up The Jam"
 Technotronic - "Spin That Wheel"
 Tina Turner - "Goldeneye"
 Toni Braxton - "You're Makin' Me High"
 U2 - "Discotheque"
 U2 - "Lemon"
 Ultra Naté - "New Kind of Medicine"
 Utah Saints - "What Can You Do for Me"
 Vanessa Williams - "Happiness 
 Whigfield - "Think Of You"
 Whigfield - "Sexy Eyes"
 Whitney Houston - "Love Will Save the Day" (remixed by David Morales & John "Jellybean" Benitez)
 Whitney Houston - "So Emotional"
 Yazz - "Stand Up for Your Love Rights"

See also 
List of Puerto Ricans
List of number-one dance hits (United States)
List of artists who reached number one on the US Dance chart

References

External links
Official website
Official Def Mix website
Resident Advisor
David Morales' on Discogs

Spirit of House Interview with David Morales
Interview with DJ Times, 2005

1961 births
American dance musicians
American electronic musicians
American house musicians
Record producers from New York (state)
Club DJs
American DJs
DJs from New York City
Electronic dance music DJs
Grammy Award winners
Hispanic and Latino American musicians
Living people
Mercury Records artists
Musicians from New York City
Nightlife in New York City
American people of Puerto Rican descent
Remixers